The Volcán Barú (also Volcán de Chiriquí) is an active stratovolcano and the tallest mountain in Panama, at  high. It is also the twelfth highest peak in Central America.

Due to its height and the narrowness of the isthmus of Panama, it is possible (though relatively rare) to see both the Pacific Ocean and Caribbean Sea from Volcán Barú's peak on a clear day.

Geography
The small town of Volcán at the base of Volcán Barú sits on the remnants of a huge lahar that appears to have breached the caldera.  A small river has eroded the lahar exposing an ancient forest below dated to about 1000 years old.

Volcán Barú is surrounded by a fertile area of cool highlands drained by the Chiriquí Viejo and Caldera Rivers. The towns of Volcán and Cerro Punta can be found on its western side, while Boquete is on the eastern flank.

The occasional fall of hail or ice pellets has been reported on the summit, where the minimum temperature can be below 0 °C (32 °F) and the formation of frost is frequent during the dry season. The peak is host to a large installation of broadcast towers.

Description
De Boer et al. were the first to show that El Barú volcano is active and part of the extension of the Central American Volcanic Arc in Panama.  Further detailed work on the geochemistry of the lavas from El Barú and other volcanoes in Panama was completed by Defant et al. They substantiated, based on geochemistry, that the lavas were derived by subduction (calc-alkaline).  Radiometric dates also showed that the volcanism falls into two groups that range from 20 million years to recent. They also showed that the youngest volcanism consists primarily of adakites (partial melts from the subducted slab) whereas the older volcanism is normal calc-alkaline lavas.

USGS Volcano-Hazards Assessment Study
In 2006, an earthquake swarm was registered in the Volcán Barú area. This was not the first one; researchers cite at least three other seismic events of the same nature recorded in the recent past (1930, 1965, 1985).

In 2007, the U.S. Geological Survey (USGS), in cooperation with Panama's Science, Technology and Innovation Secretariat (SENACYT) and the U.S. Agency for International Development (USAID), published a study on different aspects of Volcán Barú. The 33-page report outlined potential hazard areas, rock composition, and areas affected by previous eruptions; there is evidence that during the last eruption, which occurred in the 16th century, the debris avalanche deposits covered a volume of 20–30 km³, reaching as far as the Pacific Ocean (the largest documented in Central America and nearly 10 times the area covered by the Mt. St. Helens debris avalanche in 1980).

Data collected at several locations from four previous eruptions which occurred during the last 1600 years indicate that a new eruption would last several years, putting at risk population and costly infrastructure in the areas surrounding the volcano. Typical events during such volcanic episodes include pyroclastic flows, super-heated gas clouds rapidly descending the volcano's east flank, conceivably reaching as far as Boquete, Alto Boquete, and the Caldera River, and fallout of ash and other particles ranging in size from dust to 1-meter blocks, known as tephra, causing fires, roof collapses, water contamination, crop damage and eye and lung irritation, especially among elders and infants. A third type of event, mud and debris flows, known as lahars, create landslides, obstruct rivers courses, and could have long-term effects in the zone.  The severity of these events is directly related to the lava flows and their interaction with underground water deposits.

A comprehensive set of maps is included with the study, clearly showing the most likely affected areas in Boquete, Volcán, Bambito and other towns in vicinity of the Volcán Barú. The study recommends local authorities should make the population aware of the potential risks, and create a response system in preparation for the eventual onset of an eruptive episode.

National park
It is a part of the Mesoamerican Biological Corridor. Fauna include the black guan, black-and-white hawk-eagle, Underwood's water mouse, volcano junco, wrenthrush, and yellow-thighed brushfinch. Over 250 species of birds have been identified within the park, and all five species of big cats live here as well. The national park protects a range of habitat, including humid montane forests, low humid montane forests, and montane rainforests.

The park's most popular hiking trail is the Sendero Los Quetzales (Los Quetzales Trail), which connects Boquete with Cerro Punta and wraps around the side of the volcano. The trail takes around 6 hours to hike. There is another trail to the top of the volcano, but this is long, steep and strenuous. You can, however, see both the Pacific Ocean and Caribbean Sea from the summit on a clear day.

Gallery

See also
 List of volcanoes in Panama
 Protected areas of Panama

References

External links

 Volcan Baru Virtual Tour
 USGS Volcano Hazards Program - Volcán Barú: Eruptive History and Volcano-Hazards Assessment

Mountains of Panama
Stratovolcanoes of Panama
National parks of Panama
Chiriquí Province
Highest points of countries
Pleistocene stratovolcanoes
Holocene stratovolcanoes
Talamancan montane forests